The Finnish national under-19 football team is the national under-19 football team of Finland.

UEFA European Under-19 Championship

UEFA European Under-19 Championship

Competitive record

UEFA European Youth Tournament
 1975 runners-up

Current squad
 The following players were called up for the 2023 UEFA European Under-19 Championship qualification matches.
 Match dates: 16, 19 and 22 November 2022
 Opposition: ,  and Caps and goals correct as of:''' 26 September 2022, after the match against .

Coaching staff

 Head coach: Kai Nyyssönen
 Coach: Juho Rantala
 Goalkeeping Coach: Jani Meriläinen
 Video Analyst: Kalle Marjamäki
 Doctor: Ilari Kuitunen
 Physiotherapist: Niklas Virtanen
 Kit Manager: Sami Miettinen
 Team Manager: Ville Sairanen

See also
 Finland national football team
 Finland national under-21 football team
 Finland national under-17 football team

References

European national under-19 association football teams
Finland national football team